The 2000 Armenian First League season started on 21 April 2000. Armenicum became the league champions, and were promoted to the Armenian Premier League.

Overview
 Armenicum joined the league
 Tavush joined the league
 Dinamo-2 Yerevan joined the league
 Karabakh-2 Yerevan was dropped from the league because its first team will participate due to relegation from the Premier League.

Participating teams

League table

Top goalscorers

See also
 2000 Armenian Premier League
 2000 Armenian Cup
 2000 in Armenian football

References

External links
 RSSSF: Armenia 2000 - Second Level

 

Armenian First League seasons
2
Armenia